The Audi Q7 is a mid-size luxury crossover SUV made by the German manufacturer Audi, unveiled in September 2005 at the Frankfurt Motor Show. Production of this seven-seater SUV began in the autumn of 2005 at the Volkswagen Bratislava Plant in Bratislava, Slovakia. It was the first SUV offering from Audi and went on sale in 2006. Later, Audi's second SUV, the Q5, was unveiled as a 2009 model. Audi has since unveiled a third SUV model, the Q3, which went on sale in the third quarter of 2011, and a fourth SUV model, the Q2, which went on sale in November 2016. The Q7 shares a Volkswagen Group MLB platform and chassis with the Bentley Bentayga, Lamborghini Urus, Porsche Cayenne and the Volkswagen Touareg.

First generation (Typ 4L; 2005)

Overview
The Q7 (internally designated Typ 4L) utilizes a modified version of the Volkswagen Group PL71 platform.  Previewed by the Audi Pikes Peak quattro concept car, the Q7 is designed more for on-road use, and was not meant for serious off-road use where a transfer case is needed. In an off-road test through the Australian outback it fared well for a "soft roader".

Although it lacks a low-range transfer case, it has quattro permanent four-wheel drive system with a central locking differential, and a self-levelling air suspension with Continuous Damping Control, called Adaptive air suspension, which helps in off-road situations.

Development began in 2002 under the code AU 716, primarily focused on the Pikes Peak Concept. Design work was frozen for the Concept in July 2002, for presentation at the North American International Auto Show in January 2003. Following the introduction of the concept, full-scale development began on Typ 4L of the PL71 platform.

The production design was frozen in late 2003, for a late 2005 start of production. Prototypes went into testing in 2004, with development concluding in the first half of 2005. It introduced the world's only series production passenger car V12 TDI diesel engine. While the Q7 has been the flagship SUV in Audi's product portfolio, a top-of-the-line coupé model, called the Audi Q8, was released for sale in 2018. It debuted in its concept form at the 2017 Detroit Auto Show.

Sales

Features
Q7 offers an optional feature marketed as Audi Music Interface (AMI), to allow user manipulation of an iPod or similar MP3-style player, which can play through the Multi Media Interface.
Q7 was the first Audi model to offer Side Assist, a type of blind-spot detection and warning system.

Engines
Source

0– performance for Q7 3.6 VR6 FSI is 8.5s, 4.2 V8 FSI is 7.4s and for 6.0 V12 TDI is 5.5s.

The 2007-2009 4.2L V8 FSI use the AISIN TR-60SN transmission, that can handle up to 1000NM engine torque.

Safety

Despite its multiple airbags and safety electronics, such as Electronic Stability Programme (ESP), the Q7 scored only four stars out of five in the Euro NCAP crash test for adult occupant protection. According to Audi, this was caused by a design error, and has since been fixed in cars manufactured after the test which should allegedly lead to five stars. Official tests to prove this remain to be done as of March 2009.

However, in the United States, the Q7 received five out of five stars from the National Highway Traffic Safety Administration (NHTSA) safety test for both front and side impacts. The Insurance Institute for Highway Safety awarded the Q7 its Top Safety Pick 2009, with Good ratings in all 14 measured categories of the front and side impact test.

The 2015 Q7 has a rollover risk of 18.5%.

North American models
It was first released as 2007 model, with Q7 4.2 quattro available at launch.

Q7 hybrid (2005)
The Q7 hybrid is a concept vehicle using the engine from the 4.2 FSI with an electric motor to provide  extra torque, and nickel-metal hydride battery. It has 0– acceleration time of 6.8 seconds. The vehicle weighs ,  heavier than the petrol counterpart.

The vehicle was unveiled at the 2005 Frankfurt Motor Show.

Audi reportedly was going to introduce a hybrid version of the Q7 sometime in the future. However, the low US dollar caused Audi to drop the plans for the US market, but stated limited quantities would be available for the commercial market. Audi's research and development chief, Michael Dick, later announced Q7 hybrid would be produced in limited numbers for test purposes only and that development work would focus on a more advanced lithium-ion battery-based hybrid system for the Q5.

Q7 3.0 TDI clean diesel (2010)
The Q7 3.0 TDI clean diesel is a version of the 3.0 V6 TDI with selective catalytic reduction. The engine was later used in the next generation of the Q7 for the European market.

US models of the 2009 Audi Q7 TDI Premium went on sale in 2009–04 with a base MSRP of $50,900 (excluding a destination charge of $825, taxes, title or dealer charges).

Q7 4.2 TDI (2007–2009)
The vehicle was unveiled at the 2007 Geneva Motor Show.

The production version went on sale in early summer 2007.

Q7 V12 TDI (2008–2012)

The V12 TDI engine was "based" on the diesel technology from Audi R10 TDI race car, though both engines are completely unrelated: the bore / stroke / angle of the blocks are different and they do not share a single component. This gives the vehicle a  acceleration time of 5.5 seconds. The Q7 V12 TDI is, according to Audi, the best handling Q7 due to a revised suspension, tires and brakes. Audi claims the Q7 V12 TDI can handle a lateral acceleration of over .9 g on a  skid-pad.

The concept vehicle originally appeared at the 2006 Paris Motor Show.

Audi had announced V12 diesel version for the US market using diesel emission treatment technology jointly developed with Volkswagen and Mercedes-Benz under the label "BlueTec". Audi cancelled the plan to federalize the Q7 V12 TDI for the US market due in part to the global financial crisis of 2008.

This V12 version is no longer available for the model year 2013 in anticipation of the cosmetic and mechanical update of Q7 for 2014. The auto listing websites, mobile.de and autoscout24.de, have shown the 2012 model year availability of V12 version.

Audi Q7 coastline (2008)
The Audi Q7 coastline is a concept version of the Q7 V12 TDI that features an Inuit white interior with wood decoration. The design theme was inspired by luxury yachts. The vehicle was unveiled at the 2008 Geneva Motor Show.

Lawsuit on the use of the letter Q
In early 2005, Nissan North America Inc. filed a lawsuit against Audi over the use of the letter "Q" as a model name.

Audi is using the "Q" for the designation of their quattro four-wheel drive system, used in production cars for over twenty-five years (Audi's Quattro trademark is actually an umbrella term for several types of four-wheel-drive systems developed by Torsen, Haldex Traction AB, and Borg-Warner, the latter being used in the Q7). Nissan's Infiniti marque first used Q for their 1989 Infiniti Q45 flagship, but later expanded to its entire lineup, with Q for passenger cars (the Q30, Q40, Q50, and Q60) and QX for SUVs (the QX30, QX50, QX60, and QX70).

A settlement between Audi AG and Nissan was reached in late 2006. The agreement stipulates that Audi will only use the Q-prefix for three models, the Q3, Q5 and the Q7.

Facelift (2010–2015)

The vehicle was unveiled at the 2009 Pebble Beach Concours d'Elegance.

Exterior changes include new front and rear lights which better incorporate LED lighting with optional LED turn signals and daytime running lights, new wheel designs, chrome accents, four new paint colours, and updated body styling in the front and rear.

A redesigned interior includes a new instrument cluster, new leather seating, ambient door lighting, new interior colour choices, new trim, and the third generation MMI control system.

Q7 3.0 TDI clean diesel quattro (2009–2015)

It is a version of 3.0 TDI with selective catalytic reduction. CO2 emission was reduced to 234 g/km with Euro 6 certification, but the vehicle is  heavier.

Per Popular Mechanics 01 Oct. 2009,  at 72.5MPH with an RPM of 2,200 - 2,500 (the sweet spot of the top 6th gear), the car achieved a 29.6 MPG of diesel.  The 8-speed transmission, available 2011 and later, was 11-14% more fuel-efficient than the previous 6-speed transmission (available since 2009-2010 model year) in U.S. models.

Q7 2011
A brand new facelift brought optional LED headlights, an 8-speed transmission, start/stop fuel-saving technology, CO2 rating reduced to 195 g/km, and a wraparound tailgate design. Also, more flat and metallic colours became available and 21-inch titanium-effect wheels became an optional extra. Certain models now achieved upwards of 37 MPG IMP. The 3.6 L V6 and 4.2 L V8 gasoline engines both of which are naturally-aspirated have been replaced by 3.0 L supercharged V6 gasoline engines. Both engines have the same fuel economy.

Q7 2012
Audi added their new Audi Connect to the MMI system, which adds internet-driven POI search, via user input or the voice control system, as well as access to online services delivering local fuel prices, news, weather and other information. Audi Connect also offers in-car WiFi connectivity for up to 8 devices.

2012 was the last model year for the V12 version.

US models
The vehicles were introduced in 2006 as 2007 models. Available models include 3.6 FSI Quattro and 4.2 FSI Quattro.

Changes include standard LED taillights with available LED turn signals and daytime running lights and SIRIUS traffic system.

The production version went on sale in July 2006.

For 2011, the 3.6 FSI and 4.2 FSI engines were replaced by two 3.0 L TFSI supercharged engines.

The V12 Diesel engine is not available in the United States.

Engines

Transmission
All models include 6-speed Tiptronic automatic transmission as standard. A 6-speed manual transmission was offered only in Europe on the first generation Q7 with the 3.6-litre engine.
From 2010 (2011 model year in the U.S.), 8-speed automatic transmission is standard.

Second generation (Typ 4M; 2015)

The second generation Audi Q7 was unveiled in January 2015 at the North American International Auto Show in Detroit. The diesel- and petrol-powered versions were released for retail sales in 2015, followed shortly by diesel-powered plug-in hybrid variant, which is sold in Europe, but not in Canada.

An electronically controlled clutch can disconnect the V6 engine from the rest of the powertrain. The Q7 e-tron produces  emissions between 50 and 48 g/km, and has a fuel consumption of  under the New European Driving Cycle (NEDC).

Audi announced a Q7 e-tron TFSI at the 2015 Shanghai motor show, developed specially for Asian markets (China, South Korea, Singapore and Japan). The standard consumption of 2.5 liters of fuel (94.1 US mpg) corresponds to  emissions of less than 60 grams per kilometer (96.6 g/mi).

The Audi Q7 2.0 TFSI (1984 cc, 185 kW / 252 hp) is also available in the Russia, United States, Canada, India and the Middle East.

The first units of the diesel-powered Audi Q7 e-tron were registered in Germany in April 2015. Cumulative sales of the plug-in hybrid in Germany totaled 344 units through April 2016.

Due to its large size and poor environmental record, Environmental Action Germany nominated the Audi Q7 Plug-In for their Goldener Geier (Golden Vulture) 2020 award.

Markets
The second generation of the Q7 will be the first of the Q7 to be sold in Bangladesh. For Marvel Studios' Captain America: Civil War Audi debuted a commercial for the SQ7 directed by the Russo brothers featuring unreleased scenes from the car chase feature in the film as well as providing several SQ7 and other vehicles for the film. When the new Thai Audi agent launched the latest generation Q7 earlier this year, it opted to sell the petrol versions in the guises of 252 hp 2.0-litre four-cylinder (known as 40 TFSI) and 333 hp 3.0-litre V6 (45 TFSI).

Safety

Engines

2020 facelift 

The Q7 was revised for 2020, introducing styling tweaks such as a redesigned grille, front and rear bumpers, new side sills, chrome trim for the tailgate and revised exhaust tips. It comes with two-tone paint as standard, which highlights the front splitter, side skirts, wheel arches and rear diffuser in anthracite, a range of mild-hybrid powertrains and refined chassis. Inside, Audi installed a new infotainment system with dual touchscreens. The dashboard and center console were also updated to accommodate the new system.

LED headlights are included as standard, Matrix LEDs or HD Matrix LEDs and Audi Laser Light are offered as additional cost options. The HD Matrix LEDs and Audi Laser Light combine automatic controlled high beam with small laser module in each unit to double the range of the Q7's full beam.

Air suspension as standard (only on Prestige and Technik trims in US and Canada, respectively). Audi has also expanded the Q7's options list to include a new active roll-stabilisation system (only available on SQ7 Prestige and SQ7 in US and Canada, respectively). It provides active anti-roll bars, controlled by a 48-volt electric motor that automatically adjust to reflect the driving style and road conditions.

Three mild-hybrid 3.0-litre V6 powertrains are available, with the choice of two diesels and one petrol. An eco-focused plug-in hybrid 55 TFSI e version will be introduced a few months after initial sales.

Sales in the UK started from September 2019.

See also
 Audi Duo
 Audi A4
 Multi Media Interface

References

External links

 Audi Q7 microsite
 Audi UK Q7 page
 Audi Q7 dimensions

Q7
Luxury sport utility vehicles
Luxury crossover sport utility vehicles
Mid-size sport utility vehicles
All-wheel-drive vehicles
Euro NCAP large off-road
Plug-in hybrid vehicles
Cars introduced in 2006

2010s cars
2020s cars
Cars powered by VR engines